Miguel Ángel Reyes-Varela (born June 21, 1987) is a Mexican professional tennis player. Reyes-Varela has a career high ATP singles ranking of world No. 400, achieved on 17 June 2013. In the doubles rankings he has a career high of world No. 49, achieved on 20 August 2018. He has played multiple seasons of the Davis Cup, including on the 2011 Mexican Davis Cup squad.

ATP career finals

Doubles: 4 (1 title, 3 runners-up)

Challenger and Futures finals

Singles: 5 (4–1)

Doubles: 84 (42–42)

Notes

References

External links
 
 

1987 births
Mexican male tennis players
Sportspeople from Guadalajara, Jalisco
Living people
Tennis players at the 2016 Summer Olympics
Olympic tennis players of Mexico
Texas Longhorns men's tennis players
20th-century Mexican people
21st-century Mexican people